The bristle-crowned starling (Onychognathus salvadorii) is a species of starling in the family Sturnidae. It is found in Ethiopia, Kenya, Somalia, and Uganda.

References

bristle-crowned starling
Birds of East Africa
bristle-crowned starling
Taxonomy articles created by Polbot